Enid Crow (born 1968), is an American feminist artist who is best known for the Disaster Series, a series of self-portrait photographs.  She has had solo shows at A.I.R. Gallery (NYC), Holocene (Portland), and Constance Art Gallery (Iowa). Her photographs have been published in Venus Zine, riffRAG, 24/7, Altar. From 1991-1992, she was a member of Johannes Birringer's dance theatre company—AlienNation Co. -- in Chicago, Illinois. From 1997 to 2000 she studied Noh drama in Japan. Since 2005, she has performed with Justin Duerr in the self-described lo-fi craft pop band the Vivian Girls Experience, based on the work of artist Henry Darger.

Education 
Crow has degrees from multiple universities. She studied at the State University of New York at Geneseo where she earned a bachelor of arts degree in Dramatic Arts. Next, she did her graduate studies in theater and performance at Northwestern University. Interestingly, Crow also has multiple degrees in fields unrelated to art and performance. Crow received a degree in Education from the University of Florida along with a J.D. degree from New York University.

Style and Technique 
Much of Crow’s work exhibits a self-portrait format in which she often dresses up as various characters. Most of her work is organized into series which usually abide by a certain theme or message. For example, she pictured herself as working class laborers in “Happy Workers”, gay man in “Faggots”, stereotypical male archetypes in “History of Mustaches”, and a class of people in distress in “Disaster.” In these series, she adapts her looks, her clothes, and her surroundings to mimic the character she is trying to portray. Crow has stated that her characters are “Archetypal people and usually the way I think of the character is.”  Many of her photographs are intentionally comical.

External links
Enid Crow's website
A.I.R. Gallery website

References 

American photographers
Feminist artists
Actresses from New York (state)
1968 births
Living people
American women photographers
21st-century American women